Jamia Ayanna Fields (born September 24, 1993) is an American soccer forward who plays for the Washington Spirit in the National Women's Soccer League.

Early life 
She was born in Alta Loma, California. She attended Florida State University, where she was part of the Florida State Seminoles team that won the 2014 NCAA Division I Women's Soccer Tournament.

Club career 
Fields was drafted by the Boston Breakers with the 14th pick in the 2015 NWSL College Draft. After spending pre-season with the Breakers, Fields would sign with the Western New York Flash for the 2015 season. She was selected by the Orlando Pride in the 2015 Expansion Draft. In two seasons with the Orlando Pride, Fields made 28 appearances with the club. She was released by the Pride before the 2018 season.

On March 28, 2018, Fields announced she was joining Arna-Bjørnar in the Toppserien in Norway. On July 8 it was announced that her contract had been mutually terminated by the club. She had appeared in 8 games for Arna-Bjørnar.

Fields signed with Avaldsnes IL on July 28, 2018.

After attending preseason camp with the Houston Dash as a non-roster invitee, Fields was signed by the Dash for the 2019 NWSL season.

Personal life 
Her hobbies includes horseback riding, hiking and playing tennis.

References

External links 
 
 Western New York Flash player profile

1993 births
Women's association football forwards
Western New York Flash players
Living people
National Women's Soccer League players
Soccer players from California
Sportspeople from San Bernardino County, California
Florida State Seminoles women's soccer players
People from Alta Loma, Rancho Cucamonga, California
Orlando Pride players
Boston Breakers draft picks
American women's soccer players
Houston Dash players
African-American women's soccer players
21st-century African-American sportspeople
21st-century African-American women